God the Lux is the second full-length album by Polish symphonic black metal band Vesania. It was released on 25 April 2005 through Napalm Records. It was recorded in various points of time between September 2004 and January 2005. The drums, guitars and vocals were recorded at the Hendrix Studio in Lublin and engineered by Arkadiusz "Malta" Malczewski. Recordings for the bass guitar took place at the Kokszoman Studio in Warsaw and were engineered by Marecki and the keyboards were recorded at Siegmar's home studio by himself.

The recordings were mixed and mastered in February 2005 in the Hertz Studio in Białystok by Wojciech Wiesławski, Sławomir Wiesławski and Vesania.

Track listing

Notes 
  Bonus track, not included on the Polish version.

"Inlustra Nigror" has a 24-minute silence, before the track which in itself, is only a minute or so of guitar harmonies.

Personnel 
 Tomasz "Orion" Wróblewski – guitars, vocals
 Dariusz "Daray" Brzozowski – drums and percussion
 Filip "Heinrich" Hałucha – bass guitar
 Krzysztof "Siegmar" Oloś – keyboard
 Maurycy "Mauser"Stefanowicz – guitar solo on Path VIII The Mystory
 Arkadiusz "Malta" Malczewski – engineering
 Marecki – engineering
 Krzysztof "Sado" Sadowski – photography, cover concept
 Tanzteufel – cover design and artwork

References

External links 
Official website
Lyrics at the official website
Metal Archives

2005 albums
Vesania albums